Kupusina (Hungarian: Bácskertes) is a village located in the municipality of Apatin West Bačka District, Vojvodina, Serbia. As of 2011 census, it has a population of 1,921 inhabitant and Hungarian ethnic majority.

History
In June 2006 session of the Municipality of Apatin, the Hungarian language gained the status of the official language of Kupusina. Until then, Serbian language was the sole official language in this village, although Hungarians have comprised majority in the village since the country of Serbia and Montenegro was established.

Demographics

Historical population
1961: 3,133
1971: 3,063
1981: 2,694
1991: 2,500
2002: 2,356
2011: 1,921

Ethnic groups
The ethnic groups in the village as of 2002 census:
Hungarians = 1,857 (78.82%)
Serbs = 279 (11.84%)
others.

See also
 List of places in Serbia
 List of cities, towns and villages in Vojvodina

References

 Slobodan Ćurčić, Broj stanovnika Vojvodine, Novi Sad, 1996.

External links

 www.kupusina.org
 History of Kupusina 

Places in Bačka
West Bačka District
Apatin